Quin Abbey (Irish: Mainistir Chuinche), in Quin, County Clare, Ireland, was built between 1402 and 1433 by Sioda Cam MacNamara, for Fathers Purcell and Mooney, friars of the Franciscan order. Although mostly roofless, the structure of the abbey is relatively well preserved. There is an intact cloister, and many other surviving architectural features make the friary of significant historical value.

A far earlier monastery had existed on the site but burned down in 1278. A Norman castle was built soon after by Thomas de Clare, a military commander. The foundations of the castle's enormous corner towers can still be seen. Around 1350 the castle, by then a ruin, was rebuilt as a church by the McNamara clan. The abbey was rebuilt using the south curtain-wall of the old castle. It was this structure which the MacNamaras subsequently rebuilt as the present abbey, properly called a friary. In 1541, during the Reformation, King Henry VIII confiscated the friary and it passed into the hands of Conor O'Brian, Earl of Thomond. In about 1590 the MacNamaras regained control of the site and once again set about repairing and restoring it. In about 1640 the building became a college and is alleged to have had 800 students. Oliver Cromwell arrived only 10 years later, brutally murdering the friars and destroying the friary. In 1671 the building was once again restored, but never regained its former status. Eventually in 1760 the friars were expelled, although the last Friar, John Hogan, remained there until his death in 1820, by which time the buildings were ruined by neglect. 

A visitor centre is located near the building and the structure and grounds can be visited free of charge. A caretaker is permanently based at the monument. Floodlighting has recently been installed. The graveyard surrounding the friary is still in use.

References

 List of abbeys and priories in Ireland (County Clare)

External links

 Quin Franciscan Friary, Monastic Ireland
 Clare tourism, Quin Abbey opening times

Churches completed in 1350
Religious buildings and structures completed in 1433
1433 establishments in Ireland
Franciscan monasteries in the Republic of Ireland
Buildings and structures in County Clare
Religion in County Clare
Ruins in the Republic of Ireland
Christian monasteries established in the 15th century
National Monuments in County Clare
Ruined abbeys and monasteries
14th-century churches in Ireland